Lord Creator (born Kentrick Patrick, circa 1940, San Fernando, Trinidad and Tobago) is a calypso, R&B, ska and rocksteady artist. Alongside Cuban-born Roland Alphonso, Barbadian Jackie Opel and fellow Trinidadians Lynn Taitt and Lord Brynner, Lord Creator was an important and positive "outside" influence during the early development of the Jamaican music scene.

Career
He started as a calypso singer in Trinidad under the stage name Lord Creator and recorded his first hits, "The Cockhead" and "Evening News", in Trinidad in 1958 and 1959 respectively with Fitz Vaughan Bryan's big band. Due to the success of his hit "Evening News", which was released in Trinidad on the Cook label and also in the UK on the Melodisc label, he moved to Jamaica in late 1959 to perform and record and decided to settle there. In 1962, he recorded "Independent Jamaica" with producer Vincent "Randy" Chin, which became the official song marking Jamaica's independence from the British Empire on 6 August 1962. That song was also the first record on Chris Blackwell's newly founded Island Records label in the United Kingdom (Island 001).  In 1963, "Don't Stay Out Late", produced by Chin, became a hit in Jamaica.

In 1964, he had a further hit with "Big Bamboo", produced by Coxsone Dodd with Tommy McCook on saxophone.  After "Little Princess" in 1964, he recorded a calypso album, Jamaica Time, at Studio One.  It included calypso classics like "Jamaica Farewell" and "Yellowbird", as well as a cover of Bob Dylan's "Blowin' in the Wind".  His next album, Big Bamboo, was recorded at Dynamic Studios sometime after 1969, when the studio was established by Byron Lee.  Carlton Lee is listed as the producer.

Creator had another big hit with "Kingston Town", a tune he recorded for producer Clancy Eccles in 1970. After that, Lord Creator virtually disappeared from the music industry; although in 1976, he still recorded "Big Pussy Sally", a no-holding-back, free-spirited song which was done on the same tape as Fay Bennett's equally lewd and light-hearted "Big Cocky Wally" for Lee 'Scratch' Perry in the Black Ark studio. Both songs were released on two separate Island Records singles in the UK, both on the B-side accompanied by two different Upsetters dubs.  In 1978 Creator returned to the Black Ark to re-record his in 1968 in Randys studio recorded, Vincent Chin produced song, "Such is Life".
    
He returned to Trinidad and Tobago after suffering two strokes.

In 1989, the British band UB40 recorded a cover version of "Kingston Town", which helped to revive Lord Creator's career. He appeared in oldies shows in Jamaica, and toured Japan.

Following the success of the UB40 cover, Patrick returned to Jamaica, living in Montego Bay. As of August 2020 Patrick resides in Hanover Parish.

References

External links
In the Battle for Emergent Independence: Calypsos of Decolonization, by Ray Funk

20th-century Trinidad and Tobago male singers
20th-century Trinidad and Tobago singers
Calypsonians
Jamaican ska musicians
Island Records artists
Year of birth uncertain
Living people
People from San Fernando, Trinidad and Tobago
Year of birth missing (living people)